The Sal Island Cup (Portuguese: Taça da Ilha do Sal, Capeverdean Crioulo, Sal Creole: Taça Dja d' Sal, ALUPEC or ALUPEK: Tasa da Dja du Sal) is a cup competition played during the season in the island of Sal, Cape Verde, it consists of all the clubs from all the two regional divisions and are divided into about five to six rounds.  The competition is organized by the Sal Regional Football Association (Associação Regional de Futebol de Sal, ARFS).  The cup winner competed in the regional super cup final in the following season.  For several seasons, the winner qualified into Cape Verdean Cup which has been cancelled due to financial and scheduling reasons.

Its recent cup winner is SC Santa Maria who won their only title.

History
Académico do Aeroporto do Sal has won the most number of cup titles, the least are SC Santa Maria and SC Verdun.

Espargos has the most number of cup titles won numbering about 13.  Santa Maria of the south of Sal is second with four and last is Pedra de Lume of the east of Sal.

Between 2012 and 2014, SC Santa Maria was the only club who never won a cup title, in 2015, it was one of five clubs who never won a title including ASGUI and Chã de Matias, up to 2018, it was one of nine who never won a cup title. After March 31, 2018, all of the original six has a cup title or more, leaving eight clubs who never won a cup title, six of the eight included ASGUI, Chã de Matias, Florença, JURF, Oásis Atlântico and Pretória.

In the 2017-18 season, its recent non competitor was ASGUI who withdrew.

Winners

Performance By Club

Performance by area

See also
Sal Island Super Cup
Sal Island Opening Tournament
Sal Island League

References

External links
Sal Regional Football Association which includes the Sal Cup 

Sport in Sal, Cape Verde
Football cup competitions in Cape Verde
1999 establishments in Cape Verde
Recurring sporting events established in 1999